The Atlantic petrel (Pterodroma incerta) is a gadfly petrel endemic to the South Atlantic Ocean. It breeds in enormous colonies on Tristan da Cunha and Gough Island, and ranges at sea from Brazil to Namibia, with most records at sea being to the west of the breeding islands, and along the subtropical convergence. Adults are about 43 cm long, powerful, large, stocky, dark in color with white belly. Their head can appear to be grey in worn plumage. Brown undercoating of wings and tail. These petrels can live on average of 15 years of age.

Population trends 
Although the species exists in large numbers, the world population being estimated at around 5 million birds, it is listed as endangered by the IUCN. It is restricted to just two breeding islands and has declined historically due to exploitation for food. According to some studies, there are roughly 1.1 million mating pairs, but only about 25% of eggs survived. This is making their large population numbers decrease rapidly. Gough Island was the location of study, since other islands are inaccessible due to the steep cliffs. Due to reproduction mortality, this species can become locally extinct making their home range smaller.

Habitat and ecology 
The species feeds mostly on squid, which comprises 87% of its diet in some studies; it will also feed on lanternfishes (Myctophidae) as they ascend to the surface at night, as well as on crustaceans and some fish. This species is known to being nocturnal habits when feeding. The nesting locations are between 50 and 300 meters above sea level, located on cliffsides on Gough Island and formerly, at Tristan da Cunha it was upwards of 700 meters.  It nests in burrows dug in peaty soils in fern-bush vegetation.

Predators and threats 
It is currently thought to be threatened by introduced house mice, which generally attack the chicks within a 2-hour period of hatching, leading to low breeding success. Another threat to the Atlantic petrel is Hurricanes also known as a cyclone system, it has a severe impact on populations by displacing them from their habitat and breeding grounds. Feather mites, Microspalax atlanticus, are affecting the bird's population on the Brazilian coast. This species of mites is affecting a variety of wild birds in Brazil, but it has a large impact on the Atlantic petrel.

Many birds died of starvation due to their food source like squid being altered from the intense hurricanes. This is another leading threat to their decline in population. Significant mortality rate is increasing as the storms intensities increase, largely in females.

Conservation efforts 
Starting around the 1970s, on Tristan da Cunha, they have programs to teach and learn about this species and why it is important for the ecosystem. They also educate about the dangers that the birds are facing and research ways to implement protection for them in the future. Considering their populations numbers are high, their declining population is thought to be due to the mortality rate of eggs and young. Gough Island is a nature reserve and World Heritage site, there is a field station on this island to observe the Atlantic Petrels population. Research on the House mouse is important to finding ways in reducing these predators' effect on the Atlantic Petrels.

Actions proposed 
Further studies on the House mouse and find ways to eradicate mice on Gough Island. Minimize the risk of introducing other species that are invasive to Gough Island and find methods better to understand this species on their habits. Use measures of demographic mapping to better understand the island along with population trends.

It was formerly classified as a vulnerable species by the IUCN. However, new research demonstrated the severe impact of predation by mice. Consequently, it was uplisted to endangered status in 2008.

Footnotes

References
 BirdLife International (BLI) (2008a): 2008 IUCN Redlist status changes. Retrieved 2008-MAY-23.
 BirdLife International (BLI) (2008b): Atlantic Petrel Species Factsheet. Retrieved 2008-MAY-23.
 Enticott, J.W. (1991): Distribution of the Atlantic Petrel Pterodroma incerta at sea. Marine Ornithology 19(1): 49–60. PDF fulltext
 Klages, N.T.W. & Cooper, J. (1997) Diet of the Atlantic Petrel Pterodroma incerta during breeding season at South Atlantic Gough Island. Marine Ornithology 25(1+2): 13–16. PDF fulltext

Gadfly petrels
Pterodroma
Birds of the Atlantic Ocean
Birds of Argentina
Birds of Brazil
Fauna of Gough Island
Birds of Southern Africa
Birds of islands of the Atlantic Ocean
Birds of subantarctic islands
Birds of Uruguay
Endangered fauna of Africa
Endangered fauna of South America
Birds described in 1863
Species endangered by invasive species